Zakaria Al Omari is a Syrian footballer who plays for Tishreen SC, which competes in the Syrian Premier League

References

External links
 Profile at Goalzz.com

1990 births
Living people
Syrian footballers
Association football midfielders
Syria international footballers
Syrian expatriate footballers
Syrian expatriate sportspeople in Iraq
Expatriate footballers in Iraq
Syrian Premier League players